The following is a summary of censuses carried out in the Soviet Union:

See also
Russian Census
Censuses in Ukraine

Notes

References

 
Demographics of the Soviet Union
Soviet Union